"Echo" is a song by Georgian singer Iru Khechanovi, released on 16 March 2023. The song is set to represent Georgia in the Eurovision Song Contest 2023 after Khechanovi won the fifth season of The Voice Georgia, Georgia's national selection to choose their artist for that year's Eurovision Song Contest.

Eurovision Song Contest

The Voice Georgia 
The Georgian representative for the Eurovision Song Contest 2023 was selected through the fifth season of The Voice Georgia, the Georgian version of the reality television singing competition format The Voice. The competition commenced on 8 December 2022 and concluded with a final on 2 February 2023.

In the final of the show, eight artists would compete, with Iru being drawn to perform last. Singing Loreen's "Euphoria", she would emerge victorious with a total of 21.88% of the televote. With the victory, she was selected to represent Georgia in the Eurovision Song Contest 2023. "Echo", however, was internally selected by Georgian Public Broadcasting (GPB) after Khechanovi had won the competition, and was announced to release on 16 March by GPB.

At Eurovision 
According to Eurovision rules, all nations with the exceptions of the host country and the "Big Five" (France, Germany, Italy, Spain and the United Kingdom) are required to qualify from one of two semi-finals in order to compete for the final; the top ten countries from each semi-final progress to the final. The European Broadcasting Union (EBU) split up the competing countries into six different pots based on voting patterns from previous contests, with countries with favourable voting histories put into the same pot. On 31 January 2023, an allocation draw was held, which placed each country into one of the two semi-finals, and determined which half of the show they would perform in. Georgia has been placed into the second semi-final, to be held on 11 May 2023, and has been scheduled to perform in the second half of the show.

References 

2023 singles
2023 songs
Eurovision songs of 2023
Eurovision songs of Georgia (country)